The 2014–15 Riksserien season was the eighth season of the Swedish Women's Hockey League. The season began in September 2014 and ended in March 2015. After going undefeated during the regular season, Linköping HC won their second consecutive Swedish championship. 

It was the last season in which the league played with eight teams, expanding to ten before the 2015–16 season, the last season in which Piteå-based Munksund-Skuthamns SK played, being taken over by Luleå HF in the summer of 2015, and the first season in which SDE Hockey played in the top flight.

In the relegation playoffs against the top Damettan teams, both SDE and IF Sundsvall Hockey were able to keep their place in the SDHL, being joined by HV71 and Djurgårdens IF for the 2015–16 season.

Standings 
Each team played 28 regular season games, with three points being awarded for winning in regulation time, two points for winning in overtime or shootout, one point for losing in overtime or shootout, and zero points for losing in regulation time. At the end of the regular season, the team that finishes with the most points is crowned the league champion.

Regular season

Riksserien awards 
Best Goaltender: Sara Grahn
Best Defender: Annie Svedin
Best Forward: Denise Altmann
Riksserien MVP: Kim Martin Hasson
Swedish Ice Hockey Association Hockey Girl of the Year: Emilia Ramboldt

See also 
 Women's ice hockey in Sweden

References

External links 
 League website
 Official season statistics from the Swedish Ice Hockey Association

SDHL
2014–15 in European ice hockey leagues
Women's ice hockey competitions in Sweden
Swedish Women's Hockey League seasons